are Japanese businesses that specialize in breaking up relationships, often by drawing one of the partners into an affair or by producing other incriminating evidence. For a fee, a customer names a target, and an undercover employee of the company then attempts to initiate an affair with the target or produce other incriminating evidence. Though most often used to gather evidence of infidelity for use in a divorce case, it may also be used for purposes ranging from bringing shame to someone, securing the resignation of an employee, luring away the lover of one's spouse, or breaking up some other relationship.

The activities of these agencies were first widely reported in about 2000, and in 2001 
the TV network NTV aired a drama series Wakaresase-ya.
In 2005 there were around twelve such companies in Japan, but the field has grown since with companies offering services through the internet. In 2010 an internet search located some 270 wakaresaseya agencies.
The cost of retaining such an agency was given as ranging from 500,000 to 1.6 million yen, not including a success bonus of 250,000 - 800,000 yen.

People involved in the business agree that men make easier targets and will almost always be seduced by good looking operatives.

The industry was especially reported on by Japanese and foreign media  in 2010 when a former operative of a wakaresaseya agency was sentenced for murder.
He had fallen in love with a female target the company had assigned to him. After the true nature of the relationship came to light, she wanted to leave him and he killed her.

See also
Honey trapping
Kompromat

References

Divorce
Service companies of Japan
Japanese culture
Entrapment